Economics & Philosophy is a triannual peer-reviewed academic journal covering different aspects of philosophy and economics. It was established in 1985 and is published by Cambridge University Press. The editors-in-chief are Zvi Safra (Warwick University), Itai Sher (University of Massachusetts), Katie Steele (Australian National University), and Peter Vanderschraaf (University of Arizona).

Abstracting and indexing
The journal is abstracted and indexed in:
Current Contents/Social and Behavioral Sciences
EconLit
Philosopher's Index
ProQuest databases
Scopus
Social Sciences Citation Index
According to the Journal Citation Reports, the journal has a 2021 impact factor of 1.615.

See also
List of philosophy journals

References

External links

Triannual journals
Publications established in 1985
Cambridge University Press academic journals
English-language journals
Philosophy of economics
Philosophy journals
Economics journals
Hybrid open access journals